Islami Tehreek Pakistan commonly known as ITP (Urdu: اسلامی تحریک پاکستان) is a Pakistani political party founded by Syed Sajid Ali Naqvi in 2012. The party's symbol are two swords. It is mostly active in Gilgit-Baltistan.

History 
Islami Tehreek Pakistan was founded in 2012. It took part in the 2015 Gilgit-Baltistan Assembly Elections. It won three seats and was the second major party in Gilgit-Baltistan before Pakistan Muslim League (N). The opposition leader Muhammad Shafi was from Islami Tehreek Pakistan at the point. It has also contested many candidates for the 2020 Gilgit-Baltistan Assembly Elections.

Electoral history

2015 GB Elections 
Islami Tehreek Pakistan won three seats in the elections and one was reserved for technocrats. The reserved seat for technocrat was Muhammad Shafi who became the opposition leader at the time. ITP became the second major party in Gilgit-Baltistan.

2020 GB Elections 
For the 2020 elections, Islami Tehreek Pakistan partnered with Pakistan Tehreek-e-Insaf, & win the 1 seat in Gilgit-Baltistan Assembly.

References 

Political parties in Pakistan
Organisations designated as terrorist by Pakistan